Ryōhei, Ryohei, Ryouhei or Ryohhei (written: 良平, 領平, 涼平, 陵平, 亮平, 凌平, 凌兵, 量平, 遼平 or 了平) is a masculine Japanese given name. Notable people with the name include:

, Japanese film director
, Japanese footballer
, Japanese singer
, Japanese baseball player
, Japanese baseball player
, Japanese speed skater
, Japanese footballer
, Japanese composer
, Japanese gymnast
, Japanese voice actor
, Japanese sport shooter
, Japanese footballer
, Japanese artist
, Japanese footballer
, Japanese voice actor
, Japanese actor and model
, Japanese photographer
, Japanese footballer
, Japanese actor
, Japanese footballer and manager
Ryohei Ron Tsutsui (born 1977), Japanese film producer
, Japanese political theorist
, Japanese singer
, Japanese footballer
, Japanese footballer

Fictional characters
, a character in the manga series Katekyo Hitman Reborn!
, a character in the manga series Gender-Swap at the Delinquent Academy

Japanese masculine given names